Pongsan County is a county in North Hwanghae province, North Korea.

Administrative divisions
Pongsan county is divided into 1 ŭp (town), 1 rodongjagu (workers' district) and 18 ri (villages):

Transport
Pongsan county is served by several stations on the P'yŏngbu and Hwanghae Ch'ŏngnyŏn lines of the Korean State Railway.

References

Counties of North Hwanghae